This is a list of moths of the family Geometridae that are found in South Africa. It also acts as an index to the species articles and forms part of the full List of moths of South Africa.

Acanthovalva bilineata (Warren, 1895)
Acanthovalva capensis Krüger, 2001
Acanthovalva focularia (Geyer, 1837)
Acanthovalva inconspicuaria (Hübner, 1796)
Acidaliastis bicurvifera Prout, 1916
Acidaliastis curvilinea (Prout, 1912)
Acidaliastis prophanes Prout, 1922
Acollesis fraudulenta Warren, 1898
Acollesis terminata Prout, 1912
Acrasia crinita Felder & Rogenhofer, 1875
Adicocrita araria (Guenée, 1858)
Adicocrita discerpta (Walker, 1861)
Adicocrita koranata (Felder & Rogenhofer, 1875)
Afrophyla vethi (Snellen, 1886)
Allochlorodes elpis Prout, 1917
Allochrostes biornata Prout, 1913
Allochrostes imperfecta Prout, 1916
Allochrostes saliata (Felder & Rogenhofer, 1875)
Anacleora extremaria (Walker, 1860)
Anacleora pulverosa (Warren, 1904)
Androzeugma mollior Prout, 1922
Antharmostes papilio Prout, 1912
Anthemoctena textilis (Wallengren, 1872)
Aphilopota conturbata (Walker, 1863)
Aphilopota decepta Janse, 1932
Aphilopota euodia Prout, 1954
Aphilopota inspersaria (Guenée, 1858)
Aphilopota interpellans (Butler, 1875)
Aphilopota iphia Prout, 1954
Aphilopota patulata (Walker, 1863)
Aphilopota perscotia Prout, 1931
Aphilopota phanerostigma Prout, 1917
Aphilopota rubidivenis (Prout, 1922)
Aphilopota semiusta (Distant, 1898)
Aphilopota sinistra Prout, 1954
Aphilopota subalbata (Warren, 1905)
Aplocera efformata (Guenée, 1858)
Aplocera trajectata (Walker, 1863)
Argyrographa moderata (Walker, 1862)
Argyrophora arcualis (Duncan [& Westwood], 1841)
Argyrophora confluens Krüger, 1999
Argyrophora intervenata (Prout, 1917)
Argyrophora leucochrysa Krüger, 1999
Argyrophora retifera Krüger, 1999
Argyrophora rhampsinitos Krüger, 1999
Argyrophora stramineata Krüger, 1999
Argyrophora trofonia (Cramer, 1779)
Argyrophora variabilis Krüger, 1999

Ascotis reciprocaria (Walker, 1860)
Ascotis selenaria ([Denis & Schiffermüller], 1775)
Aspitates illepidata Walker, 1862
Aspitates inceptaria Walker, 1863
Aspitates sabuliferata Walker, 1863
Asthenotricha inutilis Warren, 1901
Asthenotricha pycnoconia Janse, 1933
Asthenotricha serraticornis Warren, 1902
Barrama impunctata Warren, 1897
Bathycolpodes chloronesis Prout, 1930
Biclavigera deterior Prout, 1916
Biclavigera fontis Prout, 1938
Biclavigera praecanaria (Herrich-Schäffer, 1855)
Biclavigera rufivena (Warren, 1911)
Biclavigera uloprora Prout, 1938
Buttia noctuodes Warren, 1904
Cabera aquaemontana (Prout, 1913)
Cabera elatina (Prout, 1913)
Cabera neodora Prout, 1922
Cabera nevillei Krüger, 2000
Cabera pseudognophos (Prout, 1917)
Cabera strigata (Warren, 1897)
Callioratis abraxas Felder, 1874
Callioratis curlei Staude, 2001
Callioratis mayeri Staude, 2001
Callioratis millari Hampson, 1905

Cartaletis concolor Warren, 1905
Cartaletis libyssa (Hopffer, 1857)
Celidomphax quadrimacula Janse, 1935
Celidomphax rubrimaculata (Warren, 1905)
Centrochria deprensa (Prout, 1913)
Cerurographa bistonica (Prout, 1922)
Chelotephrina acorema Krüger, 2001

Chiasmia abnormata (Prout, 1917)
Chiasmia alternata (Warren, 1899)
Chiasmia amarata (Guenée, 1858)
Chiasmia arenosa (Butler, 1875)
Chiasmia assimilis (Warren, 1899)
Chiasmia boarmioides Krüger, 2001
Chiasmia bomfordi Krüger, 2001
Chiasmia brongusaria (Walker, 1860)
Chiasmia brunnescens Krüger, 2001
Chiasmia castanea Krüger, 2001
Chiasmia confuscata (Warren, 1899)
Chiasmia contaminata (Warren, 1902)
Chiasmia costiguttata (Warren, 1899)
Chiasmia deceptrix Krüger, 2001
Chiasmia deleta Krüger, 2001
Chiasmia diarmodia (Prout, 1925)
Chiasmia duplicilinea (Warren, 1897)
Chiasmia feraliata (Guenée, 1858)
Chiasmia furcata (Warren, 1897)
Chiasmia fuscataria (Möschler, 1887)
Chiasmia grimmia (Wallengren, 1872)
Chiasmia grisescens (Prout, 1916)
Chiasmia hunyani Krüger, 2001
Chiasmia inaequilinea (Warren, 1911)
Chiasmia inconspicua (Warren, 1897)
Chiasmia inquinata Krüger, 2001
Chiasmia interrupta (Warren, 1897)
Chiasmia johnstoni (Butler, 1893)
Chiasmia kirbyi (Wallengren, 1875)
Chiasmia majestica (Warren, 1901)
Chiasmia marmorata (Warren, 1897)
Chiasmia maronga Krüger, 2001
Chiasmia melsetter Krüger, 2001
Chiasmia multistrigata (Warren, 1897)
Chiasmia murina Krüger, 2001
Chiasmia nana (Warren, 1898)
Chiasmia natalensis (Warren, 1904)
Chiasmia nevilledukei Krüger, 2001
Chiasmia ngami Krüger, 2001
Chiasmia nobilitata (Prout, 1913)
Chiasmia normata (Walker, 1861)
Chiasmia observata (Walker, 1861)
Chiasmia orientalis Krüger, 2001
Chiasmia paucimacula Krüger, 2001
Chiasmia pinheyi Krüger, 2001
Chiasmia procidata (Guenée, 1858)
Chiasmia rectilinea (Warren, 1905)
Chiasmia rectistriaria (Herrich-Schäffer, 1854)
Chiasmia rhabdophora (Holland, 1892)
Chiasmia semiolivacea Krüger, 2001
Chiasmia semitecta (Walker, 1861)

Chiasmia simplicilinea (Warren, 1905)
Chiasmia sororcula (Warren, 1897)
Chiasmia streniata (Guenée, 1858)
Chiasmia subcurvaria (Mabille, 1897)
Chiasmia subvaria (Bastelberger, 1907)
Chiasmia suriens (Strand, 1912)
Chiasmia tecnium (Prout, 1916)
Chiasmia threnopis (D. S. Fletcher, 1963)
Chiasmia tristis Krüger, 2001
Chiasmia trizonaria (Hampson, 1909)
Chiasmia turbulentata (Guenée, 1858)
Chiasmia umbrata (Warren, 1897)
Chiasmia umbratilis (Butler, 1875)
Chiasmia uniformis Krüger, 2001
Chiasmia vau (Prout, 1913)
Chiasmia zobrysi Krüger, 2001
Chionopora tarachodes Prout, 1922
Chlorerythra rubriplaga Warren, 1895
Chlorissa albistrigulata (Warren, 1897)
Chlorissa articulicornis (Prout, 1916)
Chlorissa attenuata (Walker, 1862)
Chlorissa dorsicristata (Warren, 1905)
Chlorissa inornata Prout, 1930
Chlorissa malescripta (Warren, 1897)
Chlorissa ruficristata (Prout, 1916)
Chlorissa unilinea (Warren, 1897)

Chloroclystis consocer Prout, 1937
Chloroclystis dentatissima Warren, 1898
Chloroclystis derasata (Bastelberger, 1905)
Chloroclystis gymnoscelides Prout, 1916
Chloroclystis muscosa (Warren, 1902)
Chlorocoma clopia Prout, 1922
Chlorocoma didita (Walker, 1861)
Chlorocoma dilatata (Walker, 1861)
Chlorocoma eucela Prout, 1922
Chloroctenis conspersa Warren, 1909
Chlorosterrha dichroma (Felder & Rogenhofer, 1875)
Chlorosterrha monochroma Prout, 1912
Chrysocraspeda leighata Warren, 1904
Chrysocraspeda nigribasalis Warren, 1909
Cleora acaciaria (Boisduval, 1833)
Cleora betularia (Warren, 1897)
Cleora cancer D. S. Fletcher, 1967
Cleora echinodes D. S. Fletcher, 1967
Cleora flavivenata D. S. Fletcher, 1967
Cleora herbuloti D. S. Fletcher, 1967
Cleora munda (Warren, 1899)
Cleora nigrisparsalis (Janse, 1932)
Cleora oligodranes (Prout, 1922)
Cleora panarista D. S. Fletcher, 1967
Cleora pavlitzkiae (D. S. Fletcher, 1958)
Cleora quadrimaculata (Janse, 1932)
Cleora rothkirchi (Strand, 1914)
Cleora tulbaghata (Felder & Rogenhofer, 1875)
Coenina poecilaria (Herrich-Schäffer, 1854)
Collix foraminata Guenée, 1858
Colocleora divisaria (Walker, 1860)
Colocleora faceta (Prout, 1934)
Colocleora proximaria (Walker, 1860)
Comibaena leucospilata (Walker, 1863)
Comostolopsis apicata (Warren, 1898)
Comostolopsis capensis (Warren, 1899)
Comostolopsis germana Prout, 1916
Comostolopsis rubristicta (Warren, 1899)
Comostolopsis stillata (Felder & Rogenhofer, 1875)
Conchylia actena Prout, 1917
Conchylia albata Janse, 1934
Conchylia canescens (Prout, 1925)
Conchylia decorata (Warren, 1911)
Conchylia ditissimaria Guenée, 1858
Conchylia frosinaria (Stoll, 1790)
Conchylia gamma Prout, 1915
Conchylia irene Prout, 1915
Conchylia lapsicolumna Prout, 1916
Conchylia nitidula (Stoll, 1782)
Conchylia nymphula Janse, 1934
Conchylia pactolaria Wallengren, 1872
Conchylia rhabdocampa Prout, 1935
Conchylia sesqsuifascia (Prout, 1913)
Conchyliodes distelitis Prout, 1930

Conolophia aemula (Warren, 1894)
Conolophia conscitaria (Walker, 1861)
Cyclophora lyciscaria (Guenée, 1857)
Cyclophora sanguinata (Warren, 1904)
Dichroma equestralis Duncan [& Westwood], 1841
Diptychis geometrina Felder, 1874
Disclisioprocta natalata (Walker, 1862)
Discomiosis arciocentra Prout, 1922
Discomiosis crescentifera (Warren, 1902)
Dolosis illacerata Prout, 1912
Dorsifulcrum xeron Herbulot, 1979

Drepanogynis admiranda (Warren, 1905)
Drepanogynis agrypna (Prout, 1938)
Drepanogynis albifluxa Krüger, 2002
Drepanogynis albilinea Krüger, 2002
Drepanogynis algoaria (Felder & Rogenhofer, 1875)
Drepanogynis amydrogramma Krüger, 2002
Drepanogynis angulilinea Krüger, 2002
Drepanogynis angustifascia Krüger, 2002
Drepanogynis angustimargo Krüger, 2002
Drepanogynis antennaria (Guenée, 1858)
Drepanogynis anthracinata Krüger, 2002
Drepanogynis arcuatilinea Krüger, 2002
Drepanogynis arcuifera Prout, 1934
Drepanogynis argentinitens Krüger, 2002
Drepanogynis aspitatifax Krüger, 2002
Drepanogynis athroopsegma Prout, 1925
Drepanogynis aurifera Krüger, 2002
Drepanogynis auriferoides Krüger, 2002
Drepanogynis aurifex Krüger, 2002
Drepanogynis auriflava Krüger, 2002
Drepanogynis bifasciata (Dewitz, 1881)
Drepanogynis bipartita (Warren, 1914)
Drepanogynis biviaria (Guenée, 1858)
Drepanogynis breviramus Krüger, 2002
Drepanogynis brunneisparsa Krüger, 2002
Drepanogynis calligrapha Krüger, 2002
Drepanogynis cambogiaria (Guenée, 1858)
Drepanogynis canilinea (Prout, 1925)
Drepanogynis carneata (Warren, 1904)
Drepanogynis chelicerata Krüger, 2002
Drepanogynis chromatina (Prout, 1913)
Drepanogynis chrysobates Krüger, 2002
Drepanogynis circumroda Krüger, 2002
Drepanogynis climax Krüger, 2002
Drepanogynis cnephaeogramma (Prout, 1938)
Drepanogynis commutata (Prout, 1938)
Drepanogynis confusa Krüger, 2002
Drepanogynis costipicta (Prout, 1932)
Drepanogynis curvaria (Dewitz, 1881)
Drepanogynis curvifascia (Prout, 1916)
Drepanogynis dami (Prout, 1938)
Drepanogynis dentatilinea Krüger, 2002
Drepanogynis dentatimargo Krüger, 2002
Drepanogynis determinata (Walker, 1860)
Drepanogynis devia (Prout, 1913)
Drepanogynis dochmoleuca (Prout, 1917)
Drepanogynis dukei Krüger, 2002
Drepanogynis ecprepes Krüger, 2002
Drepanogynis ectoglauca Krüger, 2002
Drepanogynis ennomaria (Warren, 1904)
Drepanogynis epione (Prout, 1913)
Drepanogynis excurvata Krüger, 2002
Drepanogynis figurata (Warren, 1905)
Drepanogynis fortilimbata Prout, 1938
Drepanogynis fuscimargo (Warren, 1898)
Drepanogynis glaucichorda Prout, 1916
Drepanogynis gloriola (Prout, 1913)
Drepanogynis griseisparsa Krüger, 2002
Drepanogynis hilaris Krüger, 2002
Drepanogynis hypenissa (Butler, 1875)
Drepanogynis hypoplea Prout, 1938
Drepanogynis inaequalis (Prout, 1915)
Drepanogynis inangulata (Warren, 1905)
Drepanogynis incondita (Warren, 1904)
Drepanogynis incurvata Krüger, 2002
Drepanogynis insciata (Felder & Rogenhofer, 1875)
Drepanogynis interscripta (Prout, 1922)
Drepanogynis intricata (Warren, 1905)
Drepanogynis intrusilinea Krüger, 2002
Drepanogynis irvingi Janse, 1932
Drepanogynis kalahariensis Krüger, 2002
Drepanogynis lactimacula Krüger, 2002
Drepanogynis latipennis Krüger, 2002
Drepanogynis latistriga Krüger, 2002
Drepanogynis lavata Krüger, 2002
Drepanogynis leptodoma Prout, 1917
Drepanogynis longiramus Krüger, 2002
Drepanogynis micrographa Krüger, 2002
Drepanogynis miltophyris Krüger, 2002
Drepanogynis mixtaria Guenée, 1858
Drepanogynis monas Prout, 1916
Drepanogynis nebulosa Krüger, 2002
Drepanogynis neopraefidens Krüger, 2002
Drepanogynis nigrapex (Prout, 1913)
Drepanogynis nigrobrunnea Krüger, 2002
Drepanogynis nipholibes (Prout, 1938)
Drepanogynis niveata Krüger, 2002
Drepanogynis obscurefascia Krüger, 2002
Drepanogynis ocellata Warren, 1897
Drepanogynis oinophora Krüger, 2002
Drepanogynis olivescens (Warren, 1898)
Drepanogynis orthobates (Prout, 1917)
Drepanogynis ostracina Krüger, 2002
Drepanogynis pallidimargo Krüger, 2002
Drepanogynis parapraefidens Krüger, 2002
Drepanogynis parva Krüger, 2002
Drepanogynis perirrorata Krüger, 2002
Drepanogynis pero Prout, 1917
Drepanogynis phaeoscia Krüger, 2002
Drepanogynis prouti Krüger, 2002
Drepanogynis pulla Krüger, 2002
Drepanogynis pumila Krüger, 2002
Drepanogynis punctata (Warren, 1897)
Drepanogynis ravida Krüger, 2002
Drepanogynis rhodampyx (Prout, 1938)
Drepanogynis robertsoni (Prout, 1925)
Drepanogynis rosea Krüger, 2002
Drepanogynis rufaria (Warren, 1909)
Drepanogynis rufigrisea (Warren, 1911)
Drepanogynis sectilis (Prout, 1938)
Drepanogynis serrifasciaria (Herrich-Schäffer, 1854)
Drepanogynis simonsi (Prout, 1938)
Drepanogynis sinuata (Warren, 1905)
Drepanogynis smaragdaria Krüger, 2002
Drepanogynis smaragdioides Krüger, 2002
Drepanogynis soni (Prout, 1938)
Drepanogynis spatulifurca Krüger, 2002
Drepanogynis stepheni Krüger, 2002
Drepanogynis striata Krüger, 2002
Drepanogynis strigulosa Prout, 1916
Drepanogynis subochrea (Prout, 1917)
Drepanogynis synclinia (Prout, 1938)
Drepanogynis tabacicolor Krüger, 2002
Drepanogynis trachyacta (Prout, 1922)
Drepanogynis tripartita (Warren, 1898)
Drepanogynis valida (Warren, 1914)
Drepanogynis vara Prout, 1922
Drepanogynis variciliata Krüger, 2002
Drepanogynis villaria (Felder & Rogenhofer, 1875)
Drepanogynis viridipennis Krüger, 2002
Drepanogynis viridipilosa Krüger, 2002
Drepanogynis xanthographa Krüger, 2002
Drepanogynis xylophanes Krüger, 2002
Durbana setinata (Felder & Rogenhofer, 1875)
Dysrhoe olbia (Prout, 1911)
Eccymatoge melanoterma Prout, 1913
Ecpetala caesiplaga (Prout, 1935)
Ectropis atelomeres Prout, 1922
Ectropis delosaria (Walker, 1862)
Ectropis fraudulenta Janse, 1932
Ectropis obliquilinea Prout, 1916
Ectropis paracopa Prout, 1925
Ectropis simplex (Warren, 1914)
Ectropis spoliataria (Walker, 1860)
Ectropis sublimbata (Warren, 1911)
Elophos barbarica Prout, 1915
Encoma inaccurata (Prout, 1913)

Eois grataria (Walker, 1861)
Eois rectifasciata D. S. Fletcher, 1958
Epicleta calidaria Prout, 1915
Epicosymbia dentisignata (Walker, 1863)
Epicosymbia nitidata (Warren, 1905)
Epicosymbia perstrigulata (Prout, 1913)
Epigynopteryx eugonia Prout, 1935
Epigynopteryx fulva (Warren, 1897)
Epigynopteryx maeviaria (Guenée, 1858)
Epigynopteryx ommatoclesis (Prout, 1922)
Epigynopteryx subspersa (Warren, 1897)
Epigynopteryx townsendi D. S. Fletcher, 1958
Epione chalcospilata Walker, 1863
Epirrhoe annulifera (Warren, 1902)
Epirrhoe edelsteni Prout, 1916
Episteira confusidentata (Warren, 1897)
Erastria albicatena (Warren, 1895)
Erastria leucicolor (Butler, 1875)
Erastria madecassaria (Boisduval, 1833)
Ereunetea reussi Gaede, 1914
Eucrostes disparata Walker, 1861
Eucrostes rhodophthalma Prout, 1912
Eucrostes rufociliaria Herrich-Schäffer, 1855
Euexia percnopus Prout, 1915
Eulycia accentuata (Felder & Rogenhofer, 1875)
Eulycia extorris (Warren, 1904)
Eulycia grisea (Warren, 1897)
Eulycia subpunctata (Warren, 1897)
Euphyia distinctata (Walker, 1862)

Eupithecia albicristulata Prout, 1922
Eupithecia altitudinis Krüger, 2000
Eupithecia angustiarum Krüger, 2000
Eupithecia brachyptera Prout, 1913
Eupithecia celatisigna (Warren, 1902)
Eupithecia cinnamomata D. S. Fletcher, 1951
Eupithecia coaequalis Janse, 1933
Eupithecia devestita (Warren, 1899)
Eupithecia festiva Prout, 1916
Eupithecia gradatilinea Prout, 1916
Eupithecia hypophasma Prout, 1913
Eupithecia inconclusaria Walker, 1862
Eupithecia infausta Prout, 1922
Eupithecia infectaria (Guenée, 1858)
Eupithecia infelix Prout, 1917
Eupithecia inscitata Walker, 1863
Eupithecia irenica Prout, 1937
Eupithecia laticallis Prout, 1922
Eupithecia licita Prout, 1917
Eupithecia liqalaneng Krüger, 2000
Eupithecia maloti Krüger, 2000
Eupithecia mendosaria (Swinhoe, 1904)
Eupithecia monticola Krüger, 2000
Eupithecia nigribasis (Warren, 1902)
Eupithecia perculsaria (Swinhoe, 1904)
Eupithecia perigrapta Janse, 1933
Eupithecia pettyi Prout, 1935
Eupithecia pettyioides Krüger, 2000
Eupithecia picturata (Warren, 1902)
Eupithecia polylibades Prout, 1916
Eupithecia pretoriana (Prout, 1922)
Eupithecia rediviva Prout, 1917
Eupithecia reginamontium Krüger, 2000
Eupithecia regulosa (Warren, 1902)
Eupithecia rubiginifera Prout, 1913
Eupithecia sagittata (Warren, 1897)
Eupithecia subcanipars Prout, 1917
Eupithecia subconclusaria Prout, 1917
Eupithecia subscriptaria Prout, 1917
Eupithecia thessa Prout, 1935
Eupithecia undiculata Prout, 1932
Euproutia aggravaria (Guenée, 1858)
Euproutia rufomarginata (Pagenstecher, 1893)
Eurranthis acuta (Warren, 1900)
Eurranthis subfuligata (Walker, 1863)
Fulvaria striata Fawcett, 1916
Geolyces convexaria (Mabille, 1890)
Glossotrophia natalensis Prout, 1915
Gnophos afflictata Walker, 1863
Gnophos delagardei Prout, 1915
Gnophos euryta Prout, 1922
Gnophos rubricimixta Prout, 1915
Gonanticlea meridionata (Walker, 1862)
Gymnoscelis olsoufieffae Prout, 1937
Gymnoscelis oribiensis Herbulot, 1981
Haplolabida coaequata (Prout, 1935)
Haplolabida inaequata (Walker, 1861)
Hebdomophruda apicata Warren, 1897
Hebdomophruda complicatrix Krüger, 1998
Hebdomophruda confusatrix Krüger, 1998
Hebdomophruda crassipuncta Krüger, 1997
Hebdomophruda crenilinea Prout, 1917
Hebdomophruda curvilinea Warren, 1897
Hebdomophruda diploschema Prout, 1915
Hebdomophruda disconnecta Krüger, 1997
Hebdomophruda endroedyi Krüger, 1998
Hebdomophruda errans Prout, 1917
Hebdomophruda eupitheciata (Warren, 1914)
Hebdomophruda hamata Krüger, 1997
Hebdomophruda imitatrix Krüger, 1998
Hebdomophruda irritatrix Krüger, 1998
Hebdomophruda kekonimena Krüger, 1997
Hebdomophruda nigroviridis Krüger, 1997
Hebdomophruda orhtolinea Krüger, 1998
Hebdomophruda sculpta Janse, 1932
Hebdomophruda southeyae Krüger, 1997
Hebdomophruda tephrinata Krüger, 1997
Hemistola ereuthopeza Prout, 1925
Hemistola incommoda Prout, 1912
Hemistola semialbida Prout, 1912
Hemixesma anthocrenias Prout, 1922
Heterorachis despoliata Prout, 1916
Heterorachis disconotata Prout, 1916
Heterorachis fuscoterminata Prout, 1915
Heterorachis gloriola Thierry-Mieg, 1915
Heterorachis perviridis (Prout, 1912)
Heterorachis platti Janse, 1935
Heterorachis simplicissima (Prout, 1912)
Heterostegane auranticollis Prout, 1922
Heterostegane bifasciata (Warren, 1914)
Heterostegane minutissima (Swinhoe, 1904)
Heterostegane rectistriga Prout, 1913
Hispophora lechriospilota (Prout, 1922)
Holoterpna errata Prout, 1922
Horisme filia Prout, 1913
Horisme jansei D. S. Fletcher, 1956
Horisme minuata (Walker, 1860)
Horisme obscurata Prout, 1913
Horisme pallidimacula Prout, 1925
Horisme punctiscripta (Prout, 1917)
Hypomecis barretti (Prout, 1915)
Hypomecis complacita (Prout, 1915)
Hypomecis ectropodes (Prout, 1913)
Hypomecis gladstonei (Prout, 1922)
Hypomecis gonophora (Prout, 1916)
Hypomecis separaria Möschler, 1887
Hypotephrina confertaria (Warren, 1914)
Hypotephrina crassidens Krüger, 1998
Hypotephrina exmotaria (Walker, 1861)
Hypotephrina minima Krüger, 1998
Hypotephrina nyangae Krüger, 1998
Hypotephrina polystriga Krüger, 1998
Hypotephrina serrimargo Krüger, 1998
Hypotephrina vicina Krüger, 1998
Idaea ascepta (Prout, 1915)
Idaea associata (Warren, 1897)
Idaea basicostalis (Warren, 1900)
Idaea carneilinea (Prout, 1922)
Idaea consericeata (Prout, 1913)
Idaea controversata (Prout, 1922)
Idaea draconigena Herbulot, 1981
Idaea echo (Prout, 1916)
Idaea fortificata (Prout, 1916)
Idaea fumilinea (Warren, 1903)
Idaea hardenbergi Janse, 1935
Idaea laticlavia (Prout, 1922)
Idaea leucorrheuma (Prout, 1932)
Idaea lilliputaria (Warren, 1902)
Idaea lipara (Prout, 1917)
Idaea malescripta (Warren, 1897)
Idaea nasifera (Prout, 1916)
Idaea nigrosticta (Warren, 1897)
Idaea ossicolor (Janse, 1935)
Idaea pericalles (Prout, 1913)
Idaea plesioscotia (Prout, 1925)
Idaea prosartema (Herbulot, 1956)
Idaea pulveraria (Snellen, 1872)
Idaea punctigera (Janse, 1935)
Idaea purpurascens (Prout, 1916)
Idaea rufifascia (Prout, 1916)
Idaea sinuilinea (Prout, 1913)
Idaea squamulata (Warren, 1900)
Idaea sublimbaria (Warren, 1900)
Idaea subterfundata (Prout, 1922)
Idaea torrida (Warren, 1904)
Idaea trissosemia (Prout, 1922)
Idaea umbricosta (Prout, 1913)
Idiochlora approximans (Warren, 1897)
Idiodes saxaria (Guenée, 1858)
Idiotephra hondensis Krüger, 2000
Idiotephra ngomensis Krüger, 2000
Illa nefanda Warren, 1914
Isoplenia trisinuata Warren, 1897
Isoplenodia vidalensis Sihvonen & Staude, 2010

Isturgia arizeloides Krüger, 2001
Isturgia catalaunaria (Guenée, 1858)
Isturgia deerraria (Walker, 1861)
Isturgia disputaria (Guenée, 1858)
Isturgia dukuduku Krüger, 2001
Isturgia exerraria (Prout, 1925)
Isturgia exospilata (Walker, 1861)
Isturgia geminata (Warren, 1897)
Isturgia perplexa Krüger, 2001
Isturgia spissata (Walker, 1862)
Isturgia supergressa (Prout, 1913)
Larentia attenuata (Walker, 1862)
Larentia bitrita (Felder & Rogenhofer, 1875)
Larentia diplocampa Prout, 1917
Larentia indiscriminata Walker, 1863
Larentioides cacothemon Prout, 1917
Lasiochlora bicolor (Thierry-Mieg, 1907)
Lasiochlora diducta (Walker, 1861)
Leucaniodes periconia Prout, 1922

Lhommeia biskraria (Oberthür, 1885)
Lhommeia subapicata (Warren, 1899)
Ligdia batesii Wallengren, 1875
Ligdia interrupta Warren, 1897
Ligdia pectinicornis Prout, 1913
Lobidiopteryx eumares Prout, 1935
Lomographa aridata (Warren, 1897)
Lomographa indularia (Guenée, 1858)
Lophostola atridisca (Warren, 1897)
Loxopora dentilineata Warren, 1914
Luashia zonata (Walker, 1863)
Lycaugidia albatus (Swinhoe, 1885)
Mauna ardescens Prout, 1916
Mauna ava Prout, 1938
Mauna drakensbergensis Herbulot, 1992
Mauna filia (Cramer, 1780)
Mauna pictifimbria Prout, 1938
Mauna sematurga Prout, 1938
Melanthia ustiplaga (Warren, 1899)
Melinoessa croesaria Herrich-Schäffer, 1855

Menophra absurda (Prout, 1917)
Menophra caeca (Prout, 1913)
Menophra contemptaria (Walker, 1860)
Menophra obtusata (Warren, 1902)
Menophra serrataria (Walker, 1860)
Mesocolpia lita (Prout, 1916)
Mesocolpia nanula (Mabille, 1900)
Metallochlora dyscheres Prout, 1922
Metallochlora grisea Prout, 1915
Miantochora gumppenbergi (Möschler, 1887)
Microbaena pulchra Staudinger, ????
Microligia confinis Krüger, 1999
Microligia dolosa Warren, 1897
Microligia luteitincta Prout, 1916
Microligia paradolosa Krüger, 1999
Microligia pseudodolosa Krüger, 1999
Microligia septentrionalis Krüger, 1999
Microloxia ruficornis Warren, 1897
Mictoschema swierstrai Prout, 1922
Mictoschema tuckeri Prout, 1925
Milocera aurora Krüger, 2001
Milocera dubia (Prout, 1917)
Mimoclystia explanata (Walker, 1862)
Mimoclystia mermera (Prout, 1935)
Mimoclystia pudicata (Walker, 1862)
Mimoclystia tepescens Prout, 1922
Mimoclystia undulosata Warren, 1901
Mixocera albistrigata (Pagenstecher, 1893)
Mixocera frustratoria (Wallengren, 1863)
Mixocera parvulata (Walker, 1863)
Mixocera viridans Prout, 1912
Mixocera xanthostephana Prout, 1912
Nassinia caffraria (Linnaeus, 1767)
Nassinia pretoria Prout, 1916
Neromia activa Prout, 1930
Neromia barretti Prout, 1912
Neromia cohaerens Prout, 1916
Neromia impostura Prout, 1915
Neromia phoenicosticta Prout, 1912
Neromia quieta (Prout, 1912)
Neromia rhodomadia Prout, 1922
Neromia rubripunctilla Prout, 1912
Neromia strigulosa Prout, 1925
Neurotoca endorhoda Hampson, 1910
Oaracta auricincta Walker, 1862
Oaracta neophronaria (Oberthür, 1912)
Obolcola aliena Prout, 1922
Obolcola decisa (Warren, 1914)
Obolcola deocellata Prout, 1913
Obolcola flavescens Prout, 1913
Obolcola insecura Janse, 1932
Obolcola pallida Janse, 1932
Obolcola petronaria (Guenée, 1858)
Obolcola pulverea (Prout, 1917)
Ochroplutodes haturata (Walker, 1860)
Odontopera erebaria Guenée, 1858
Odontopera homales (Prout, 1922)
Odontopera integraria Guenée, 1858
Odontopera paliscia (Prout, 1922)
Odontopera perplexata (Warren, 1904)
Odontopera stictoneura (Prout, 1917)
Oedicentra albipennis Warren, 1902
Omizodes complanata Prout, 1922
Omizodes ocellata Warren, 1894
Omphacodes delicata (Warren, 1905)
Omphacodes punctilineata (Warren, 1897)
Omphacodes vivida (Warren, 1899)
Omphalucha albosignata Janse, 1932
Omphalucha angulilinea (Janse, 1932)
Omphalucha apira Prout, 1938
Omphalucha crenulata (Warren, 1897)
Omphalucha ditriba Prout, 1938
Omphalucha exocholoxa Prout, 1938
Omphalucha indeflexa Prout, 1922
Omphalucha katangae Prout, 1934
Omphalucha maturnaria (Möschler, 1883)
Omphalucha praeses Prout, 1938
Omphax bacoti Prout, 1912
Omphax bilobata Janse, 1935
Omphax idonea Prout, 1916
Omphax leucocraspeda Prout, 1912
Omphax modesta (Warren, 1897)
Omphax plantaria Guenée, 1858
Omphax rhodocera (Hampson, 1910)
Omphax shorti Prout, 1912
Omphax trilobata Janse, 1935
Omphax vicinitaria (Wallengren, 1863)

Onycodes traumataria Guenée, 1858
Orbamia octomaculata (Wallengren, 1872)
Orgyiodes caparia (Walker, 1862)
Orthonama obstipata (Fabricius, 1794)
Ozola pulverulenta Warren, 1897
Pachycnemoides basutensis Krüger, 1999
Pachycnemoides inops Krüger, 1999
Pachycnemoides minor Krüger, 1999
Pachycnemoides obfuscata Krüger, 1999
Pachycnemoides zonaria Krüger, 1999
Palaeaspilates carnea (Warren, 1914)
Palaeaspilates inoffensa Warren, 1894
Palaeonyssia trisecta (Warren, 1897)
Panagropsis equitaria (Walker, 1861)
Panagropsis muricolor (Warren, 1897)
Paraprasina discolor Warren, 1897
Pareclipsis distolochorda Prout, 1916
Pareclipsis incerta Prout, 1916
Pareclipsis leptophyes Prout, 1916
Pareclipsis ochrea (Warren, 1905)
Pareclipsis onus Prout, 1917
Pareclipsis oxyptera Prout, 1916
Pareclipsis phaeopis Prout, 1922
Pareclipsis punctata Warren, 1900
Parortholitha moerdyki Herbulot, 1980
Parortholitha subrectiaria (Walker, 1861)
Perizoma africana (Warren, 1911)
Perizoma alumna (Prout, 1925)
Perizoma artifex Prout, 1925
Perizoma epipercna (Prout, 1913)
Perizoma eviscerata Warren, 1914
Perizoma lamprammodes (Prout, 1911)
Perizoma petrogenes (Prout, 1922)
Perusiopsis veninotata Warren, 1914
Petovia marginata Walker, 1854

Phaiogramma stibolepida (Butler, 1879)
Phoenicocampa terinata (Felder & Rogenhofer, 1875)
Phthonandria pinguis (Warren, 1904)
Piercia bryophilaria (Warren, 1903)
Piercia cidariata (Guenée, 1858)
Piercia ciliata Janse, 1933
Piercia dibola Prout, 1935
Piercia dryas (Prout, 1915)
Piercia emmeles (Prout, 1922)
Piercia leptophyes Prout, 1935
Piercia lightfooti (Prout, 1925)
Piercia nimipunctata Janse, 1933
Piercia olivata Janse, 1933
Piercia perizomoides (Prout, 1916)
Piercia prasinaria (Warren, 1901)
Piercia respondens (Prout, 1922)
Piercia smaragdinata (Walker, 1862)
Piercia spatiosata (Walker, 1862)
Piercia subterlimbata (Prout, 1917)
Piercia vittata Janse, 1933
Pigiopsis aurantiaca Carcasson, 1964

Pingasa abyssiniaria (Guenée, 1858)
Pingasa distensaria (Walker, 1860)
Pingasa rhadamaria (Guenée, 1858)
Pingasa ruginaria (Guenée, 1858)
Plateoplia acrobelia (Wallengren, 1875)
Platypepla flava Krüger, 2001
Platypepla griseobrunnea Krüger, 2001
Platypepla jordani Krüger, 2001
Platypepla loranthiphaga Krüger, 2001
Platypepla macilenta Krüger, 2001
Platypepla mackayi Krüger, 2001
Platypepla persubtilis Krüger, 2001
Platypepla pseudospurcata Krüger, 2001
Platypepla spurcata (Warren, 1897)
Plegapteryx anomalus Herrich-Schäffer, 1856
Polystroma subspissata Warren, 1897
Prasinocyma albisticta (Warren, 1901)
Prasinocyma bifimbriata Prout, 1912
Prasinocyma bilobata D. S. Fletcher, 1978
Prasinocyma chloroprosopa Prout, 1913
Prasinocyma dorsipuntata Warren, 1911
Prasinocyma germinaria (Guenée, 1858)
Prasinocyma hadrata (Felder & Rogenhofer, 1875)
Prasinocyma immaculata (Thunberg, 1784)
Prasinocyma inversicaulis Prout, 1913
Prasinocyma neglecta Prout, 1921
Prasinocyma niveisticta Prout, 1912
Prasinocyma panchlora Prout, 1913
Prasinocyma pictifimbria Warren, 1904
Prasinocyma pulchraria Swinhoe, 1904
Prasinocyma pupillata (Warren, 1902)
Prasinocyma unipuncta Warren, 1897
Prasinocyma vermicularia (Guenée, 1858)
Problepsis aegretta Felder & Rogenhofer, 1875
Problepsis digammata Kirby, 1896
Problepsis latonaria (Guenée, 1858)
Prosomphax callista Warren, 1911
Prosomphax deuterurga Prout, 1922
Protosteira spectabilis (Warren, 1899)
Proutiana ferrorubrata (Walker, 1863)
Proutiana perconspersa (Prout, 1915)
Pseudolarentia megalaria (Guenée, 1858)
Pseudomaenas alcidata (Felder & Rogenhofer, 1875)
Pseudomaenas anguinata (Felder & Rogenhofer, 1875)
Pseudomaenas arcuata Krüger, 1999
Pseudomaenas bivirgata (Felder & Rogenhofer, 1875)
Pseudomaenas complicata Krüger, 1999
Pseudomaenas directa Krüger, 1999
Pseudomaenas dukei Krüger, 1999
Pseudomaenas eumetrorrhoabda Prout, 1938
Pseudomaenas euzonaria Krüger, 1999
Pseudomaenas honiballi Krüger, 1999
Pseudomaenas intricata (Walker, 1858)
Pseudomaenas krooni Krüger, 1999
Pseudomaenas leucograpta (Warren, 1911)
Pseudomaenas margarita (Warren, 1914)
Pseudomaenas oncodogramma Prout, 1917
Pseudomaenas orophila Krüger, 1999
Pseudomaenas prominens Krüger, 1999
Pseudomaenas sinuata Krüger, 1999
Pseudomaenas staudei Krüger, 1999
Pseudomaenas tricolor (Warren, 1897)
Pseudomaenas turneri Prout, 1938
Psilocerea immitata Janse, 1932
Psilocerea leptosyne D. S. Fletcher, 1978
Psilocerea pulverosa (Warren, 1894)
Psilocladia obliquata Warren, 1898

Racotis apodosima Prout, 1931
Racotis breijeri (Prout, 1922)
Racotis incauta (Prout, 1916)
Racotis squalida (Butler, 1878)
Racotis zebrina Warren, 1899
Rhadinomphax divincta (Walker, 1861)
Rhadinomphax pudicata (Walker, 1866)
Rhadinomphax sanguinipuncta (Felder & Rogenhofer, 1875)
Rhadinomphax trimeni (Felder & Rogenhofer, 1875)
Rhodesia alboviridata (Saalmüller, 1880)
Rhodesia depompata Prout, 1913
Rhodesia viridalbata Warren, 1905
Rhodometra participata (Walker, 1862)
Rhodometra sacraria (Linnaeus, 1767)
Rhodometra satura Prout, 1916
Rhodophthitus atacta Prout, 1922
Rhodophthitus atricoloraria (Mabille, 1890)
Rhodophthitus commaculata (Warren, 1897)
Scardamia maculata Warren, 1897

Scopula accentuata (Guenée, 1858)
Scopula acentra (Warren, 1897)
Scopula antiloparia (Wallengren, 1863)
Scopula argyroleuca (Hampson, 1910)
Scopula astrabes Prout, 1932
Scopula bigeminata (Warren, 1897)
Scopula caesaria (Walker, 1861)
Scopula carnosa Prout, 1925
Scopula circumpunctata (Warren, 1898)
Scopula demissaria (Walker, 1863)
Scopula derasata (Walker, 1863)
Scopula deserta (Warren, 1897)
Scopula dissonans (Warren, 1897)
Scopula donovani (Distant, 1892)
Scopula duplicipuncta (Prout, 1913)
Scopula erinaria (Swinhoe, 1904)
Scopula euchroa Prout, 1925
Scopula fimbrilineata (Warren, 1902)
Scopula flexio Prout, 1917
Scopula gazellaria (Wallengren, 1863)
Scopula gnou Herbulot, 1985
Scopula hectata (Guenée, 1858)
Scopula impicta Prout, 1922
Scopula inscriptata (Walker, 1863)
Scopula insincera Prout, 1920
Scopula instructata (Walker, 1863)
Scopula internata (Guenée, 1857)
Scopula internataria (Walker, 1861)
Scopula irrufata (Warren, 1905)
Scopula lactaria (Walker, 1861)
Scopula laevipennis (Warren, 1897)
Scopula latitans Prout, 1920
Scopula ludibunda (Prout, 1915)
Scopula minorata (Boisduval, 1833)
Scopula molaris Prout, 1922
Scopula monotropa Prout, 1925
Scopula natalica (Butler, 1875)
Scopula nemorivagata (Wallengren, 1863)

Scopula nigrinotata (Warren, 1897)
Scopula obliquiscripta (Warren, 1897)
Scopula opicata (Fabricius, 1798)
Scopula opperta Prout, 1920
Scopula oryx Herbulot, 1985
Scopula ourebi Herbulot, 1985
Scopula palleuca Prout, 1925
Scopula palpifera Prout, 1925
Scopula pelloniodes Prout, 1922
Scopula pertinax (Prout, 1916)
Scopula phyletis (Prout, 1913)
Scopula picta (Warren, 1897)
Scopula promethes Prout, 1928
Scopula psephis Prout, 1935
Scopula punctilineata (Warren, 1897)
Scopula quadrifasciata (Bastelberger, 1909)
Scopula quintaria (Prout, 1916)
Scopula rossi (Prout, 1913)
Scopula ruficolor (Prout, 1916)
Scopula rufisalsa (Warren, 1897)
Scopula sanguinisecta (Warren, 1897)
Scopula sarcodes Prout, 1935
Scopula serena Prout, 1920
Scopula spoliata (Walker, 1861)
Scopula straminea (Felder & Rogenhofer, 1875)
Scopula sublobata (Warren, 1898)
Scopula subobliquata (Prout, 1913)
Scopula tenuiscripta Prout, 1917
Scopula zophodes Prout, 1935
Scotopteryx albiclausa (Warren, 1897)
Scotopteryx atrosigillata (Walker, 1863)
Scotopteryx crenulimargo (Prout, 1925)
Scotopteryx cryptocycla (Prout, 1913)
Scotopteryx cryptospilata (Walker, 1863)
Scotopteryx deversa (Prout, 1913)
Scotopteryx ferridotata (Walker, 1863)
Scotopteryx horismodes (Prout, 1913)
Scotopteryx nictitaria (Herrich-Schäffer, 1855)
Scotopteryx peringueyi (Prout, 1917)
Semiothisa destitutaria (Walker, 1861)
Semiothisa deviaria (Walker, 1863)
Semiothisa infixaria (Walker, 1863)
Semiothisa latiscriptata (Walker, 1863)
Sesquialtera ramecourti Herbulot, 1967
Sesquialtera ridicula Prout, 1916
Somatina centrophora Prout, 1915
Somatina ctenophora Prout, 1915
Somatina figurata Warren, 1897
Somatina mozambica (Thierry-Mieg, 1905)
Somatina prouti Janse, 1934
Somatina pythiaria (Guenée, 1858)
Somatina sedata Prout, 1922
Somatina vestalis (Butler, 1875)
Somatina virginalis Prout, 1917
Syncollesis trilineata (Hampson, 1910)

Syndromodes cellulata Warren, 1898
Syndromodes dimensa (Walker, 1861)
Syndromodes invenusta (Wallengren, 1863)
Syndromodes oedocnemis Prout, 1922
Syndromodes prasinops Prout, 1930
Terina circumcincta Prout, 1915
Thalassodes quadraria Guenée, 1857
Thelycera hemithales (Prout, 1912)
Traminda acuta (Warren, 1897)
Traminda falcata Warren, 1897
Traminda neptunaria (Guenée, 1858)
Traminda obversata (Walker, 1861)
Traminda ocellata Warren, 1895
Traminda vividaria (Walker, 1861)
Veniliodes inflammata Warren, 1894
Veniliodes pantheraria (Felder, 1874)
Victoria albipicta Warren, 1897
Victoria fuscithorax Warren, 1905
Victoria rhodoblemma Prout, 1938
Xanthisthisa niveifrons (Prout, 1922)
Xanthorhoe albodivisaria (Aurivillius, 1910)
Xanthorhoe braunsi Janse, 1933
Xanthorhoe exorista Prout, 1922
Xanthorhoe melissaria (Guenée, 1858)
Xanthorhoe mimica Janse, 1933
Xanthorhoe poseata (Geyer, 1837)
Xanthorhoe transjugata Prout, 1923
Xenimpia erosa Warren, 1895
Xenimpia lactesignata (Warren, 1914)
Xenimpia maculosata (Warren, 1897)
Xenimpia trizonata (Saalmüller, 1891)
Xenochlorodes xina Prout, 1916
Xenochroma candidata Warren, 1902
Xenochroma dyschlorata (Warren, 1914)
Xenochroma planimargo Prout, 1912
Xenochroma roseimargo Janse, 1935

Xylopteryx arcuata (Walker, 1862)
Xylopteryx prasinaria Hampson, 1909
Xylopteryx protearia Guenée, 1858
Zamarada adiposata (Felder & Rogenhofer, 1875)
Zamarada ascaphes Prout, 1925
Zamarada consecuta Prout, 1922
Zamarada deceptrix Warren, 1914
Zamarada dentigera Warren, 1909
Zamarada differens Bastelberger, 1907
Zamarada erugata D. S. Fletcher, 1974
Zamarada glareosa Bastelberger, 1909
Zamarada ilma Prout, 1922
Zamarada inermis D. S. Fletcher, 1974
Zamarada metallicata Warren, 1914
Zamarada metrioscaphes Prout, 1912
Zamarada ordinaria Bethune-Baker, 1913
Zamarada phaeozona Hampson, 1909
Zamarada plana Bastelberger, 1909
Zamarada pulverosa Warren, 1895
Zamarada transvisaria (Guenée, 1858)
Zamarada varii D. S. Fletcher, 1974
Zerenopsis lepida (Walker, 1854)
Zeuctoboarmia cataimena (Prout, 1915)
Zeuctoboarmia hyrax (Townsend, 1952)
Zeuctoboarmia octopunctata (Warren, 1897)
Zygophyxia stenoptila Prout, 1916

Geometridae
South Africa
Moths of Africa